The Gyami  ("Han Chinese") were a Han people of Sichuan at the foot of the Tibetan Plateau who were reported by Brian Houghton Hodgson in 1874.

According to Hodgson, who thought the Gyami descended from a Chinese military outpost, the Chinese considered the Gyami to be Qiangic speakers, suggesting that they did not recognize them as Han Chinese and that they did not use Chinese characters. Victor H. Mair notes that what little is recorded of their speech indicates a degree of assimilation to local languages, but that it is clearly a variety of Mandarin.

References

Mandarin Chinese
Ethnic groups in China